Trap Adventure 2 is an adventure-survival platform game. The game is known for its very hard levels, with endless traps similar to Cat Mario. It was originally released in 2016 for iOS and it gained popularity in 2018.

Gameplay 
Trap Adventure 2 is a nightmarish version of the original Super Mario Bros, and has a similar gameplay to Cat Mario. It is mostly a flip-screen game, but one part uses vertical scrolling. The game offers two modes for the player: normal mode and last chance mode. As the player runs and jumps into everything, a never-ending series of spikes, flames and other booby traps appear out of nowhere to kill the player, and once all lives are gone, it forces the player to start the game over again at the beginning with no checkpoints. The number of lives of players will increase as the player passes more levels of the game. Players have stated that the game is impossible to beat, although it has been beaten.

Reception 
Polygon describes it as a "masocore" game in the vein of ultra hard platformers. Kotaku says the reason for Trap Adventure 2‘s sudden popularity was a video that was posted on Twitter in January 2018 that illustrates just how cruel and hilarious the game can be.

References

External links 
 Official website
 Official website (WayBack Machine)

2016 video games
Single-player video games
Platform games
Adventure games
Survival video games
IOS games
Android (operating system) games
Video games developed in Japan